Ivan M. Ivan (born August 17, 1945) is an American politician and tribal leader in the state of Alaska. Elected as a Democrat who caucused with Republicans, he served in the Alaska House of Representatives  from 1991 to 1993 (25th district) and 1995 to 1999 (39th district).

Early life 
A Yup'ik, Ivan was born in Akiak, Alaska, and is a subsistence fisherman and hunter.

Career 
Prior to his election to the House of Representatives, he served as city administrator of Akiak from 1987 to 1990. During his final term in the Alaska House, he served on the Community & Regional Affairs and Military and Veterans Affairs committees.

Ivan is also a tribal leader and community chief of Akiak, and speaks both Yup'ik and English.

References 

1945 births
Living people
Yupik people
People from Bethel Census Area, Alaska
20th-century American politicians
Democratic Party members of the Alaska House of Representatives
Native American state legislators in Alaska